Nevesinjska puška (English title: "Thundering Mountains") is a 1963 Yugoslav film directed by Žika Mitrović and written by  Slavko Goldstein and Miomir 'Miki' Stamenkovic. It tells about  Herzegovina Uprising (1875–77),  which was led by ethnic Serbs against the harsh regime of Ottoman Empire.

External links
 

1963 films
Yugoslav war drama films
Serbian war drama films
Jadran Film films
Films set in the 1870s